Alcyonidium nodosum is a species of bryozoan belonging to the family Alcyonidiidae.

The species is found in Southern Africa.

The species inhabits marine environments.

References

Ctenostomatida
Marine fauna of Southern Africa
Animals described in 1944